Khallifah Rosser (born July 13, 1995) is an American hurdler who specializes in the 400 metres hurdles. He qualified for the 400 metres hurdles at the 2022 World Athletics Championships after finishing third at the 2022 USA Outdoor Track and Field Championships.

External links 
 
 Cal State Los Angeles Golden Eagles bio

1995 births
Living people
American male sprinters
American male hurdlers
People from Fontana, California
Cal State Los Angeles Golden Eagles men's track and field athletes
Diamond League winners
Track and field athletes from California